Wilbur Daigh Mills (May 24, 1909 – May 2, 1992) was an American Democratic politician who represented  in the United States House of Representatives from 1939 until his retirement in 1977. As chairman of the House Ways and Means Committee from 1958 to 1974, he was often called "the most powerful man in Washington".

Born in Kensett, Arkansas, Mills pursued a legal career and helped run his father's bank after three years at Harvard Law School, when he returned to Kensett he also assisted his father at the AP Mills General Store, as he had done for many years. In fact, he began doing the store inventory at about 10 years of age. He served as the youngest ever county judge of White County, Arkansas, then won election to the United States House of Representatives in 1938, the youngest elected from Arkansas. As the youngest chairman of the Ways and Means Committee, Mills was the Congressional architect in establishing Medicare. He was also the architect of the Tax Reform Act of 1969, lowering rates on poor and raising rates on rich, and creating the alternative minimum tax and a strong advocate for infrastructure projects, especially the interstate highway system.

Mills' name was entered in the presidential primaries in a few states in 1972, championing an automatic cost of living adjustment to Social Security, performing surprisingly well in Manchester, New Hampshire and poorly in several states in the Democratic primaries. After two public incidents with a stripper named Fanne Foxe, he stepped down as Chair of the Ways and Means and checked into the Palm Beach Institute for Alcoholism for three months and he declined to seek re-election in 1976, even though he had received more than 59% of the vote for re-election after the first incident. After leaving office, he returned to the practice of law and helped establish a center for the treatment of alcoholism, the Wilbur D. Mills Center for Alcoholism and Drug Treatment Center, while supporting similar centers around the country in their fundraising efforts.

Youth and early political life

Mills was born in Kensett, Arkansas to Abbie Lois Daigh Mills and Ardra Pickens Mills. Kensett was the first public school in Arkansas to integrate under Mills's father, who was first superintendent, then chairman of the school board, and the banker for the school district. Mills attended public schools in Kensett but graduated as valedictorian from Searcy High School in the county seat of White County. He thereafter graduated from Hendrix College in Conway, Arkansas as salutatorian, having resided in Martin Hall. He studied constitutional law at Harvard Law School under Felix Frankfurter, who later was nominated and confirmed (1939) as an associate justice of the United States Supreme Court. Mills returned to Arkansas to run his father's bank and assist with the store, during the Great Depression and was soon admitted to the Arkansas Bar Association in 1933.

Mills served as the 29th county judge of White County, between 1935 and 1939, and began small Medicare-like, county-funded program, with a $5,000 fund to pay medical bills, prescription drugs which were sold at cost, and hospital treatment for the indigent which were lowered to $2.50 per day, as well as have doctors see qualified patients free of charge. Patients were qualified for the program through petitioning the local justice of the peace, who in turn made a recommendation to Mills as county judge.

In Congress

House Ways and Means Committee

Mills served in Congress from 1939 to 1977, 17 of them (1958–1974) as chairman of the powerful House Ways and Means Committee, a post he held longer than any other person in U.S. history. Mills was often termed "the most powerful man in Washington" during his tenure. He was a signatory to the 1956 Southern Manifesto opposing the desegregation of public schools ordered by the Supreme Court in Brown v. Board of Education. However, Mills was never a segregationist: always a strong advocate for inclusion, his longest and closest aide was Walter Little, a black man from North Carolina. Mills told House Speaker Sam Rayburn that he was not going to sign the Manifesto, to which Rayburn responded by advising him that he would be defeated for re-election if he did not sign, so Mills ultimately did.

Mills's accomplishments in Congress included playing a large role, as the Congressional architect, in creating the Highway Trust Fund, opening up economic development through commerce between rivers and railroads, and then first creating the Kerr-Mills Health Insurance legislation, and then being the Congressional architect of the Medicare and Medicaid programs. Mills initially had reservations about the program because he was worried about the eventual cost, especially since the early proposals by the President and some Members of Congress proposed funding Medicare from the Social Security Trust Fund. Mills expected correctly that health care costs would continue to rise dramatically over time and, thus, would bankrupt Social Security. He saw Social Security, Medicare, and Medicaid as programs that people need to rely on and it would be economically, psychologically, and politically devastating to terminate. Mills was also acknowledged as the primary tax expert in Congress and the leading architect of the Tax Reform Act of 1969. Mills favored a conservative fiscal approach, adequate tax revenue to fund government programs, a balanced budget, while also supporting various social programs, especially Social Security and Disability, adding farmers and public employees to Social Security, unemployment compensation, and national health insurance.

In 1967, when President Lyndon Johnson required funds to support the cost of escalating the Vietnam War, Mills refused to support Johnson's proposed surtax and demanded that any tax increases be matched by equivalent cuts in federal spending. Johnson accepted his challenge and balanced the federal budget during his last fiscal year as president. Mills congratulated him, as he had actually cut more spending even than Mills had demanded. Mills and Johnson often laughed about Mills forcing a big spender to become the first President in decades to not only balance the budget but to start paying down the debt. The next one, the last one, was President Clinton. Arkansans bragged, "It takes an Arkansan to balance the federal budget and to pay down the federal debt.

Presidential candidate

Mills was drafted by friends and fellow Congressmen to make himself available as a candidate for president of the United States in 1972 in a few of the Democratic primaries. He was not strong in the primaries and won 33 votes for president from the delegates at the 1972 Democratic National Convention which nominated Senator George McGovern. His name was mentioned as a possible Secretary of Treasury in a McGovern administration.

Scandal, alcoholism, recovery and retirement
Mills was involved in a traffic incident in Washington, D.C. at 2a.m. on October 9, 1974. U.S. Park Police stopped his car late at night because his driver had not activated the vehicle's headlights. Mills was intoxicated, and his face was injured following a scuffle with Annabelle Battistella, better known as Fanne Foxe, a stripper from Argentina. When police approached the car, Foxe leapt from the vehicle and jumped into the nearby Tidal Basin. She was taken to St. Elizabeths Mental Hospital for treatment. The Park Police took Mills to his home.

Despite the scandal, Mills was re-elected in November 1974 in a heavily Democratic year with nearly 60% of the vote, defeating Republican Judy Petty. On November 30, 1974, Mills, seemingly drunk, was accompanied by Eduardo Battestella, Fanne Foxe's husband, onstage at The Pilgrim Theatre in Boston, where Foxe was performing. He held a press conference from Foxe's dressing room. Mills stepped down from his chairmanship of the Ways and Means Committee, acknowledged his alcoholism, joined Alcoholics Anonymous, and checked himself into the Palm Beach Institute in West Palm Beach, Florida for two months, where he was joined in treatment by Mrs. Mills.
Mills chose not run for re-election in 1976, and to continue to devote himself to his recovery and his work with other alcoholics in public office.  He was succeeded by a family friend, Democrat Jim Guy Tucker. Thereafter, Mills practiced tax law at the prestigious Shea and Gould Law Firm of New York's Washington Office, until he retired in 1991 and moved back to Arkansas to work on the continued development including a new campus of the Wilbur D. Mills Treatment Center for Alcoholism, the University of Arkansas for Medical Sciences's Wilbur D. Mills Endowed Chairs on Alcoholism and Drug Abuse, and the Masonic Grand Lodge's capital fundraising campaign.

Mills died in Searcy, Arkansas in 1992. He is interred at Kensett Cemetery in Kensett, Arkansas.

Personal life
Wilbur was married to Clarine "Polly" Billingsley Mills for almost 58 years from 1934 until his death in 1992; she died on October 16, 2001. They are interred side by side at the Kensett Cemetery.

Honors

Various schools, highways, and other structures in Arkansas are named for Mills:
Wilbur D. Mills University Studies High School in Sweet Home, Pulaski County, Arkansas
Wilbur D. Mills Treatment Center for Alcoholism and Drug Abuse, Searcy, Arkansas
Wilbur D. Mills Dam on the Arkansas River in Arkansas County and Desha County, Arkansas
Wilbur D. Mills Campgrounds, Tichnor, Arkansas
Wilbur D. Mills Freeway in Little Rock, Arkansas (Interstate 630)
Wilbur D. Mills Avenue in Kensett, Arkansas
Wilbur D. Mills Park in Bryant, Arkansas
Wilbur D. Mills Center, Hendrix College, Conway, Arkansas
Two Wilbur D. Mills Endowed Chairs on Alcoholism and Drug Abuse, University of *Arkansas Medical Science Campus
Wilbur D. Mills Education Services Cooperative, Beebe, Arkansas
Mills Park Road, Bryant, Arkansas
Mills Street, Walnut Ridge, Arkansas
Wilbur D. Mills Courts Building, Searcy, Arkansas
Wilbur D. Mills Library, Arkansas School for the Deaf, Little Rock, Arkansas

Sculptures of Mills are located at:
Arkansas State Capitol
Hendrix College, Mills Building, Mills Congressional Office Replica
Wilbur D. Mills University Studies High School, Sweet Home, Arkansas
Wilbur Mills Treatment Center, Searcy, Arkansas
Boswell Law Office, Bryant, Arkansas
Kay Goss Office, Alexandria, Virginia
John F. Kennedy Park, Greers Ferry Lock and Dam, Heber Springs, Arkansas

References

Further reading

Eric Patashnik Julian Zelizer. 2001. "Paying for Medicare: Benefits, Budgets, and Wilbur Mills's Policy Legacy". J Health Polit Policy Law 26 (1): 7-36.
Kay Collett Goss, ''Mr. Chairman: The Life and Legacy of Wilbur D. Mills," Parkhurst Brothers, 2012. A biography of Mills.

External links

Wilbur Mills at the Biographical Directory of the United States Congress
Time Magazine Cover

Oral History Interviews with Wilbur Mills, from the Lyndon Baines Johnson Library
Wilbur Mills materials in the South Asian American Digital Archive (SAADA)
Arkansas Congressman and the Argentine Stripper – Ghosts of DC blog

|-

1909 births
1992 deaths
Democratic Party members of the United States House of Representatives from Arkansas
Harvard Law School alumni
Hendrix College alumni
People from Kensett, Arkansas
People from Searcy, Arkansas
Candidates in the 1972 United States presidential election
20th-century American politicians